Lobotes pacificus, commonly known as the Pacific tripletail or West Coast tripletail, is a species of fish in the genus Lobotes. L. pacificus is caught in some artisanal fisheries and commercially sold. There is disagreement about whether L. pacificus is a synonym of Lobotes surinamensis (the Atlantic tripletail), but it is generally regarded as an independent species. It is categorised as Least Concern by the International Union for Conservation of Nature.

References

External links 
 

Lobotidae
Fish described in 1898